Megarrhamphus is a genus of Asian shield bugs in the subfamily Phyllocephalinae and typical of the tribe Megarrhamphini, erected by Ernst Evald Bergroth in 1891.

Species
The following are included in BioLib.cz:
 Megarrhamphus bengalensis Ahmad & Kamaluddin, 1988
 Megarrhamphus fuscus (Vollenhoven, 1868)
 Megarrhamphus hastatus (Fabricius, 1803) - type species
 Megarrhamphus intermedius (Vollenhoven, 1868)
 Megarrhamphus ismaili (Abbasi, 1986)
 Megarrhamphus limatus (Herrich-Schäffer, 1851)
 Megarrhamphus tibialis Yang, 1934
 Megarrhamphus truncatus (Westwood, 1837)

References

External links
 
 

Pentatomidae
Heteroptera genera
Shield bugs
Hemiptera of Asia
Taxa named by Ernst Evald Bergroth